Pervomaysky is a rural locality (a settlement) in Khleborobny Selsoviet, Bystroistoksky District, Altai Krai, Russia. The population was 37 as of 2013. There is 1 street.

Geography 
Pervomaysky is located on the Anuy River, 42 km south of Bystry Istok (the district's administrative centre) by road. Verkh-Anuyskoye is the nearest rural locality.

References 

Rural localities in Bystroistoksky District